ʻAisake Valu Eke is a Tongan politician and former Cabinet Minister.

Eke studied at the University of Southern Queensland in Australia, where he was awarded a PhD for his thesis "An exploratory study on the quality of service in the public sector in Tonga" completed in 2013.

A former Secretary for Finance at the Ministry of Finance, he was first elected to the Legislative Assembly at the November 2010 general election as MP for Tongatapu 5. Though close to the Democratic Party of the Friendly Islands, and despite having considered running as a party member, he stood as an independent, taking the seat with 24.1% of the vote and a 63-vote margin; Tongatapu 5 was thus the only constituency on Tongatapu (Tonga's main island) not to be won by the party.

Once elected, he told the press there was much to be done to improve the economy, and said the government should facilitate private sector activity.

In October 2011, he was one of several MPs to protest against Parliament voting large allowances to any of its members on sick leave overseas. Stating that MPs should not be spending more public money on themselves at a time when the economy was weak, he was one of eight MPs to vote against the increased allowances (along with ʻAkilisi Pohiva, Semisi Sika, Sitiveni Halapua, Sangster Saulala, Sione Taione, Falisi Tupou and Moʻale Finau, all members of the Democratic Party). The motion was adopted by twelve votes to eight.

In January 2014, Prime Minister Lord Tuʻivakano appointed him Minister of Finance, following the sacking of Lisiate ‘Akolo over a disagreement concerning the budget. He subsequently kept that position in Prime Minister ʻAkilisi Pohiva's government. In March 2017, however, he abstained during a parliamentary vote on a motion of no confidence against the government he was part of, and was compelled to resign. He subsequently lost his seat at the 2017 election.

He was re-elected in the seat of Tongatapu 5 in the 2021 election. In the aftermath of the election he was one of three candidates for Prime Minister, but was ultimately defeated by Siaosi Sovaleni, who won the Premiership with 16 votes. In May 2022 he was absolved of bribery by the Supreme Court.

Honours
National honours
  Order of Queen Sālote Tupou III, Commander (31 July 2008).

References

Members of the Legislative Assembly of Tonga
Living people
People from Tongatapu
University of Southern Queensland alumni
Independent politicians in Tonga
Finance Ministers of Tonga
Government ministers of Tonga
Year of birth missing (living people)
Knight Commanders of the Order of Queen Sālote Tupou III